"Superlove" is a song recorded by American singer Tinashe. The song was released by RCA Records on July 15, 2016. It was co-written and produced by Tricky Stewart and The-Dream.

Background and composition
"Superlove" is a pop and Miami bass song inspired by the 1980s and 1990s era.
MTV's Madeline Roth found similarities between the song and Nicki Minaj's "Super Bass", calling the latter "a poppier cousin". while Ben Dandridge-Lemco of The Fader compared it to Ghost Town DJ's "My Boo".

Tinashe described the song as a "celebration of happiness. More specifically, it celebrates the kind of happiness that is so immense and infectious, that you can't help but to rejoice in it. I hope to eulogize this wonderful energy and make people feel good, love harder, and dance together."

Critical response
Jessie Morris of Complex deemed the song "an easy contender for a summer smash with its breezy, free-flowing chords made all the sweeter by that incredible voice of Tinashe." Rolling Stone Brittany Spanos called it "bouncy" and "bubbly". Adelle Platon of Billboard found the song "infectious".

Billboard ranked "Superlove" at number 72 on their Billboards 100 Best Pop Songs of 2016" commenting “Flashing back to the mid-'90s days when Miami bass funk mixed with freestyle ingenuousness for impossibly sweet dance-pop hits from the likes of Ghost Down DJ's and INOJ, Tinashe hit the beach for her sunniest single yet, the kind of irresistibly heartbreaking summer-love song that pretends it can't see fall coming around the corner. The fact that "My Boo" still managed to be a bigger 2016 hit than this must've been pretty sobering for pop's most undervalued star.”

Music video
The music video premiered on August 12, 2016, it was filmed in Malibu, California, and directed by Hannah Lux Davis. The choreography was by Tinashe's longtime collaborator JaQuel Knight.

Critical reception
Collin Robinson from Stereogum summarized the video as a "sun-kissed beach clip with Tinashe and a group of bikini-clad “Bae Watch” lifeguards rescuing hot dudes from drowning before they hit some sultry choreography on vintage beach towels". Danny Schwartz of HotNewHipHop described the video as the "greatest thing since sliced bread".

Track listing
Digital download
"Superlove" (clean version) – 3:04

Digital download
"Superlove" (explicit version) – 3:04

The Remixes
"Superlove" (Shift K3Y Remix) – 4:14
"Superlove" (The Golden Pony Remix) – 3:22
"Superlove" (Frank Pole Remix) – 3:59
"Superlove" (FTampa Remix) – 2:58
"Superlove" (Cutmore Remix) – 3:38
"Superlove" (Mark Picchiotti Remix) – 3:55

Charts

Release history

References

2016 singles
2016 songs
Tinashe songs
RCA Records singles
Music videos directed by Hannah Lux Davis
Songs written by Tinashe
Songs written by Tricky Stewart
Songs written by The-Dream
Song recordings produced by Tricky Stewart
Song recordings produced by The-Dream
Miami bass songs